The 1989 NCAA Men's Water Polo Championship was the 21st annual NCAA Men's Water Polo Championship to determine the national champion of NCAA men's collegiate water polo. Tournament matches were played at the Indiana University Natatorium in Indianapolis, Indiana during December 1989.

UC Irvine defeated two-time defending champion California in the final, 9–8, to win their third national title. Coached by Ted Newland, the Anteaters finished the season 27–6.

The Most Outstanding Player of the tournament was Dan Smoot (UC Irvine). Smoot, along with eight other players, was named to the All-Tournament Team.

The tournament's leading scorer, with 11 goals, was Tom Warde from UC Irvine.

Qualification
Since there has only ever been one single national championship for water polo, all NCAA men's water polo programs (whether from Division I, Division II, or Division III) were eligible. A total of 8 teams were invited to contest this championship.

Bracket
Site: Indiana University Natatorium, Indianapolis, Indiana

All-tournament team 
Dan Smoot, UC Irvine (Most outstanding player)
Rich Ambidge, California
 Geoffrey Clark, Pepperdine
Chris Duplanty, UC Irvine
Chris Humbert, California
Rick McNair, Stanford
Jeff Oeding, Stanford
Sasa Poljak, Pepperdine
Tom Warde, UC Irvine

See also 
 NCAA Men's Water Polo Championship

References

NCAA Men's Water Polo Championship
NCAA Men's Water Polo Championship
1989 in sports in California
December 1989 sports events in the United States
1989